Mariano José González Fernández (23 March 1808, Asunción – February 1870, Cerro Corá) was the first vice president of Paraguay from 1845 to 1846. He was minister of finance from 1850 to 1869.

References 

1808 births
1870 deaths
People from Asunción
Paraguayan people of Spanish descent
Vice presidents of Paraguay
Finance Ministers of Paraguay
People of the Paraguayan War